Smarhon' District is a district (rajon) in Grodno Region of Belarus. As of the 2009 census the population was 55,296.

The administrative center is Smarhon’.

Main sights 

 Ahinski Manor in Zaliessie

Notable residents 

 Adam Stankievič (1882, Arlianiaty village – 1949), Belarusian Roman Catholic priest, politician and writer, a Gulag prisoner
 Jan Stankievič (1891, Arlianiaty village  – 1976), Belarusian politician, linguist, historian and philosopher
 Antoni Leszczewicz (1890, Abramaǔščyna –1943), beautified Marian Father and Roman Catholic priest, victim of the Nazis
 Andrei Tsikota, Belarusian priest, member of the Rada of the Belarusian Democratic Republic and a victim of the Gulag

References

 
Districts of Grodno Region